Ángel Juan Alonso Díaz Caneja (born 31 January 1963) is a Mexican politician affiliated with the National Action Party. As of 2014 he served as Senator of the LX and LXI Legislatures of the Mexican Congress representing Puebla and as Deputy during the LIX Legislature.

References

1963 births
Living people
People from Puebla (city)
Members of the Senate of the Republic (Mexico) for Puebla
Members of the Chamber of Deputies (Mexico) for Puebla
National Action Party (Mexico) politicians
21st-century Mexican politicians
Monterrey Institute of Technology and Higher Education alumni
Politicians from Puebla
Meritorious Autonomous University of Puebla alumni
Members of the Congress of Puebla
20th-century Mexican politicians
Deputies of the LIX Legislature of Mexico
Senators of the LX and LXI Legislatures of Mexico